The United States presidential election debates were held during the 2000 presidential election. Three debates were held between Republican candidate, Texas Governor George W. Bush and Democratic incumbent Vice President Al Gore, the major candidates. One debate was held with their vice presidential running mates, Dick Cheney and Joe Lieberman. All four debates were sponsored by the non-profit Commission on Presidential Debates (CPD), which has organized presidential debates since its establishment in 1987.

The vice presidential debate was held on October 5 at Centre College. The presidential debates were held on October 3 at the University of Massachusetts Boston, October 11 at Wake Forest University, and October 17 at Washington University in St. Louis, ahead of the November 7 Election Day. Jim Lehrer moderated each of the presidential debates. In each of the first two debates, the candidates received questions in turn with two minutes to answer and a 60-second rebuttal. The third and final debate featured a town hall meeting format.

Debate schedule

Participant selection
In 2000, the following eight candidates achieved ballot access in enough states to mathematically win the election via the Electoral College:

Responding to criticism received from the exclusion of Ross Perot in the 1996 campaign, the Commission on Presidential Debates adjusted the criteria used to invite candidates, announcing on January 6, 2000 that third-party candidates would have to reach 15 percent in pre-debate polls to receive an invitation.

Only Governor George W. Bush and Vice President Al Gore met the CPD selection criteria for any of the presidential debates. As a result, only Dick Cheney and Joe Lieberman met the criteria for the vice presidential debate.

October 3: First presidential debate (University of Massachusetts Boston) 

The debate was held in the Clark Athletic Center on the campus of the University of Massachusetts Boston. Jim Lehrer of PBS' The NewsHour posed the questions for each candidate. An estimated 46.6 million viewers tuned into the debate.

October 5: Vice presidential debate (Centre College)

Dick Cheney, Republican candidate for vice president debated Senator Joe Lieberman, the Democratic candidate for vice president. The debate was held at Centre College in Danville, Kentucky. The candidates discussed issues such as Medicare, Social Security, economic issues, the surplus, the future of the U.S. military and its decline of morale, and drugs in school and education reform.

Reflecting on the debate in 2016, Lieberman called it one of his proudest moments of the campaign, citing the debate's civil tone.

The debate was held in the Norton Center for the Arts on the campus of Centre College in Danville, Kentucky. Bernard Shaw of CNN posed the questions for each candidate. An estimated 28.5 million viewers tuned into the debate.

October 11: Second presidential debate (Wake Forest University)

The debate was held in the Wait Chapel on the campus of the Wake Forest University in Winston-Salem, North Carolina. Jim Lehrer of Public Broadcasting Service (PBS) program The NewsHour posed the questions for each candidate. An estimated 37.5 million viewers tuned into the debate.

October 17: Third presidential debate (Washington University in St. Louis)

The debate was held at the Field House on the campus of Washington University in St. Louis, Missouri. Jim Lehrer moderated the town hall-style debate, featuring questions asked by members of the audience. An estimated 37.7 million viewers tuned into the debate.

Third-party debates 

September 28, 2000 - The Independence Party of Minnesota sponsored a third-party presidential debate moderated by Minnesota Governor Jesse Ventura. In attendance for this debate were Libertarian candidate Harry Browne, Constitution Party candidate Howard Phillips, and Natural Law Party candidate John Hagelin. Both Ralph Nader and Pat Buchanan declined invitations to attend.
October 20, 2000 - Judicial Watch sponsored a third-party presidential debate at the Ronald Reagan Building in Washington, DC, moderated by radio broadcaster Jim Bohannon. Once again, Browne, Phillips, and Hagelin participated while Nader and Buchanan declined invitations.
November 3, 2000 - American University's Department of History and Commission on Fair Elections sponsored a third-party vice presidential debate at the National Press Club. Participating were vice presidential candidates Art Olivier of the Libertarian Party, Dr. J. Curtis Frazier of the Constitution Party, and Nat Goldhaber representing the Natural Law Party. Winona LaDuke and Ezola Foster of the Green and Reform Parties declined invitations.

References

External links 
 Commission on Presidential Debates
 Democracy in Action
 Open Debates 

2000
Debates